The 1963 San Francisco mayoral election was held on November 5, 1963.

Results

References 

1963 California elections
Mayoral elections in San Francisco
1963 United States mayoral elections
1963 in San Francisco